Indonesia and Venezuela established diplomatic relations in 1959. Since then, both countries enjoy friendly ties. Both nations agreed to expand the trade and investment relations, especially in tourism, technology, chemicals and natural gas sectors. Indonesia has an embassy in Caracas, while Venezuela has an embassy in Jakarta. Indonesia and Venezuela are members of multilateral organizations such as the World Trade Organization (WTO), Non-Aligned Movement and Forum of East Asia-Latin America Cooperation.

History

Nearly two decades after the establishment of diplomatic relations on October 10, 1959. Jakarta opened its embassy in Caracas in 1977. Venezuela reciprocated in 1981.

On August 12, 2000, Venezuelan president Hugo Chávez visited Jakarta and paid courtesy call to Indonesian president Abdurrahman Wahid. Subsequently, in the next month on 26–28 September 2000 Indonesian president Abdurrahman Wahid visited Caracas to attend the OPEC summit, and paid a courtesy call to Hugo Chávez. Venezuela has donated US$2 million for the relief effort promptly after the tsunami devastated Aceh in 2004. Venezuela also promoted education in Aceh by establishing Institute of Polytechnic of Venezuela-Indonesia in Aceh inaugurated in 2009.

Trade and commerce
The bilateral trade between Indonesia and Venezuela saw a remarkable increase, tripled in five years between 2003 and 2008. In 2003 the trade stood at just US$24.93 million, rose to  $82.55 million in 2007, and US$92.27 million in 2008. In 2009 bilateral trade rose to US$96 million. From Indonesia, Venezuela imported textiles, cotton, natural rubber, fiber, wood products, electrical equipment, footwear and sports equipment, while exporting plastic, cyclic amides, silicon dioxide and aluminum alloys to Indonesia. The trade balance is in favor to Indonesia, with $79.19 million worth of Indonesian exports to Venezuela in 2009.

See also
 Foreign relations of Indonesia 
 Foreign relations of Venezuela

Notes

External links
Embassy of Indonesia in Caracas, Venezuela
Embassy of the Bolivarian Republic of Venezuela in Jakarta, Indonesia

Venezuela
Bilateral relations of Venezuela